The Gros Ventre landslide is in the Gros Ventre Wilderness of Bridger-Teton National Forest, Wyoming, United States.

The landslide occurred on June 23, 1925, following melt from a heavy snowpack, several weeks of heavy rain, and earthquake tremors in the area.

It is one of the world's largest known examples of recent mass wasting events aside from volcanic eruptions. Slide Lake is now much smaller than before the flood.

Today, the landslide is partially reclaimed by the surrounding forest but is still an obvious landmark from many vantage points in the Jackson Hole valley. It is easily accessible by traveling north from Jackson, Wyoming or south from Moran, Wyoming and then taking the Antelope Flats road east off U.S. Route 26.

Etymology
In French, Gros Ventre means big belly / big stomach.

References

External links
 

Natural disasters in Wyoming
Landslides in the United States
Geography of Teton County, Wyoming
1925 in Wyoming
Bridger–Teton National Forest
Landslide-dammed lakes
Landslides in 1925